Martin E. Reiter (August 25, 1911 – February 6, 1986) was an American professional basketball player. He played college basketball for Duquesne University. Reiter then played in the National Basketball League for the Pittsburgh Pirates during the 1937–38 and 1938–39 seasons and averaged 4.8 points per game.

References

1911 births
1986 deaths
American men's basketball players
Basketball players from Pittsburgh
Duquesne Dukes men's basketball players
Guards (basketball)
Jewish men's basketball players
Pittsburgh Pirates (NBL) players